This is a list of Chinese volleyball players

Men
 Jin Zhang

Women
Chu Jinling
Hu Ying
Jin Hong
Jin Xin
Liu Shu
Liu Tingting
Liu Yanan
Qi Jianhua
Tu Yuance
Wang Lina
Wang Yimei
Yang Hao
Ye Xiaoyu
Zhao Ruirui
Zhao Yanni
Zhang Ping
Zhang Yuehong
Zhou Jia

List
Chinese
Volleyball